Zīlāni is a village in Kūkas Parish, Jēkabpils Municipality in the Latgale region of Latvia. It is located  3 km northeast of Jēkabpils town. The village lies on the A12 road, which is part of the E22. The village was formerly connected by railway but its station closed in 1995.

In the early twentieth century a number of  depot workers in the village had revolutionary ideas and their own underground organization. They smuggled weapons. Today a 50 cm long dagger used by the workers is on display at the Jēkabpils History Museum.

References

External links 
 Information about Zīlāni in the Placenames Database of Latvia 

Villages in Latvia
Jēkabpils Municipality
Dvinsky Uyezd
Latgale